The Benelli M4 is a semi-automatic shotgun produced by Italian firearm manufacturer Benelli Armi SpA, and the last of the "Benelli Super 90" series of semi-automatic shotguns. The M4 uses a proprietary action design called the "auto-regulating gas-operated" (ARGO) system, which was created specifically for the weapon. The weapon was designed in 1998, and was adopted by the armed forces of Italy, the United States, United Kingdom, among others, and has been used in a variety of conflicts, leading up to the present day.

History
On May 4, 1998, the United States Army's Armaments Research, Development and Engineering Center (ARDEC) at Picatinny Arsenal, New Jersey issued Solicitation #DAAE30-98-R-0401, requesting submissions for a new 12 gauge semi-automatic combat shotgun for the U.S. military. In response to the request, Benelli Armi SpA of Urbino, Italy designed and built the Benelli M4 Super 90 Combat Shotgun. On August 4, 1998, five samples of the M4 were delivered to Aberdeen Proving Ground, Maryland, and after intense testing, the M4 won the competition. In early 1999, ARDEC awarded the M1014 Joint Service Combat Shotgun contract to Heckler & Koch, U.S. subsidiary for importation of the Benelli M4 Combat Shotgun. The first units (count of 20,000) were delivered to the United States Marine Corps in 1999. During testing, the prototype was named XM1014, but after adoption, the "X" was dropped, and the weapon was officially designated the M1014.

Design

The M4 was the first gas-operated shotgun produced by Benelli. Its function is designed around an entirely new design called the "auto-regulating gas-operated" (ARGO) system. The short-stroke design uses two self-cleaning stainless steel pistons located just ahead of the chamber to function opposite a rotating bolt, thereby eliminating the need for the complex mechanisms found on other gas-actuated automatics. The ARGO incorporates only four parts: two symmetrical fore-end shrouds containing two small steel pistons that push directly against the bolt.

Additionally, the weapon is self-regulating for use with shotshells of varying lengths and power levels.  It can fire  and  shells of differing propellant loads without any operator adjustments and in any combination. Low-power rounds, such as less-lethal baton rounds, must be cycled manually.

The sights are military-style ghost ring and are adjustable in the field using only the rim of a shell. The MIL-STD-1913 Picatinny rail on top of the receiver allows use of both conventional optical sights and night-vision devices, while retaining use of the original iron sights.

The modular basis of the shotgun means many of its features can be reconfigured as needed. It allows a user to quickly exchange the various assembly groups (barrel, buttstock, forend, etc.) without the use of additional tools.

Durability
Preliminary testing of the M4 suggests a high level of reliability. It can reliably function for at least 25,000 rounds without replacement of any major parts.  The steel components of the weapon feature a matte black phosphated corrosion resistant finish while the aluminium parts are matte hard-anodized. These finishes reduce the weapon's visibility during night operations.

The weapon requires little maintenance and operates in all climates and weather conditions.

Collapsible buttstock
The buttstock is collapsible on the M4 Model (designated 11707) and on the M1014. Collapsing the buttstock shortens the weapon by almost , allowing easier storage and transportation; furthermore, it permits better maneuverability around tight corners and over obstacles. The M4 is also available with both pistol grip and semi-grip fixed stocks, with these also being available for the M1014.

Rail interface system
The Picatinny rail built into the top of the shotgun accepts scopes, laser illuminators, night-vision sights and flashlights. Most modern military firearms have similar structures. There are aftermarket accessories such as handguards that incorporate other rail interface systems such as M-LOK.

Benelli Tactical and the M4
Benelli Tactical is a division of Beretta's Law Enforcement (LE) division. Benelli Tactical manages the sales of all tactical shotguns to law enforcement agencies, government and military entities. The M4 shotgun is sold in three configurations: M4 Entry with a  barrel; M4 with an  barrel; and M1014, which is an M4 with the "M1014" nomenclature on it for military usage only.  M4 shotguns sold through Benelli Tactical are available with the collapsible buttstock.

Benelli Tactical and Beretta LE have maintained the belief that the collapsible buttstock, while no longer illegal in the United States, is still only to be made available to law enforcement and government agencies. Benelli Tactical/Beretta LE will not sell these stocks to private individuals. Benelli Tactical does sell the stock piece for retrofitting the pistol grip stock for $150. The stock must be direct-shipped from Italy, however it and other aftermarket stocks are commercially available and not restricted by the United States.

Suggested retail price of the civilian version is around $1,899. An NFA stamp is required to purchase or own the 14.5" barreled model only since this model is considered to be a Short Barreled Shotgun or SBS. Standard magazine capacity of the civilian version is 5+1, although it is possible to fit 6+1 and two shot extension tubes are sold by Benelli as well as some other companies. 9+1 extension tubes are also available, popular in 3-gun competitions. Some LE models have become available to private individuals on the secondary market.

Users

 
 : Benelli M4 used by Internal Troops, OMON, "Almaz" counter-terrorist unit and KGB Alpha Group. Seen with Alpha Group, Internal Troops and OCAM units deployed to Minsk during the 2020 protests. It is also allowed as civilian hunting weapon
 : in use with MIA and military special operation forces.
 : Iraqi Special Operations Forces.
 : Used by special forces and special police units (Army Ranger Wing, Special Detective Unit, Emergency Response Unit, Regional Support Unit).
 : Used by special forces.
 : Used by special forces.
 : Ordered 1800 before the Libyan Revolution of 2011. Used by special forces.
 : Used by special forces.
 : Used by Royal Malaysian Customs, Grup Gerak Khas counter-terrorism forces of Malaysian Army and PASKAU counter-terrorism team of Royal Malaysian Air Force.
 
 : Used by Portuguese Armed Forces
 : Special Anti-Terrorist Unit.
 : Special Defence Division and Intervention Group.
 : Used by Military Police Forces.
 
 : Used by the British Armed Forces designated L128A1.
 : United States Armed Forces designated M1014, Los Angeles Police Department (LAPD). Cambridge Police Department (Massachusetts).

See also
 Benelli M1
 Benelli M2
 Benelli M3

Notes

References

External links

 Benelli M4 Website
 Benelli M4 operator's manual
 Official M4 Super 90 page
 British Forces show off Firepower
 Benelli ETHOS
 Benelli Legacy
 Benelli Montefeltro
 USMC weapons: M1014 Combat Shotgun
 USMC TM 10698A-10/1 Operator's Manual for Shotgun, Combat 12 Gauge, Semi-automatic M1014 1005-01-472-3147

Benelli Armi SpA
Police weapons
Semi-automatic shotguns of Italy
United States Marine Corps equipment
Weapons and ammunition introduced in 1999